Cynthia Black Hall (born December 7, 1951) is an American politician, attorney, and scientist from New Mexico. She is a member of the New Mexico Public Regulation Commission from the 1st district, covering parts of Bernalillo County.

Education 
Hall graduated from Washington University in St. Louis in 1973 with a Bachelor of Arts degree in biology, and from Saint Louis University in 1977 with a Master of Science in physiology. 

She received her Juris Doctor from Southwestern Law School in 1983, and attended one year of an executive MBA at the UNM Anderson School of Management in 2010 and 2011.

Career 
Hall has worked as a laboratory research technician, graduate teaching assistant, nurse instructor, contract researcher, and research supervisor.

After service as a law clerk and briefly working in private law, Hall served in a number of governmental legal positions, including assistant counsel at the New Mexico Department of Energy and Minerals, licensing bureau chief at the New Mexico Regulation and Licensing Department, and assistant staff counsel at the New Mexico Public Service Commission. She was an assistant counsel in the office of the General Counsel of the Navy from 1988 to 1990, and an attorney in the general counsel's office of Sandia National Laboratories from 1990 to 1994. She began work for the New Mexico Public Regulation Commission as an associate general counsel from 2008 to 2010, than as staff attorney in the Insurance Division from 2010 to 2012.

In 2012, Hall entered the race for Public Regulation Commissioner from the 1st district to succeed Jason Marks, who was term limited. She came second in the Democratic primary behind Bernalillo County Assessor Karen Montoya, taking 33% to Montoya's 36% and state Representative Al Park's 31%. She challenged Montoya again in 2016, this time defeating her 57-43%, and winning the general election unopposed.

References

External links
 Cynthia Hall – Ballotpedia profile
 New Mexico Public Regulation Commission – official site

1951 births
21st-century American women politicians
21st-century American politicians
American women lawyers
Government lawyers
Living people
New Mexico Democrats
New Mexico lawyers
Politicians from Albuquerque, New Mexico
Saint Louis University alumni
Sandia National Laboratories people
Southwestern Law School alumni
University of New Mexico alumni
Washington University in St. Louis alumni
Women in New Mexico politics